Teutopolis Township is one of fifteen townships in Effingham County, Illinois, USA.  As of the 2010 census, its population was 2,605 and it contained 965 housing units.  It was formed from Douglas Township.

Geography

Cities, towns, villages
 Effingham (east edge)
 Teutopolis (vast majority)

Cemeteries
The township contains these two cemeteries: Saint Francis and Wood Lawn.

Major highways
  Interstate 57
  Interstate 70
  U.S. Route 40
  U.S. Route 45
  Illinois Route 33

Demographics

School districts
 Effingham Community Unit School District 40
 Teutopolis Community Unit School District 50

Political districts
 Illinois's 19th congressional district
 State House District 108
 State Senate District 54

References
 
 United States Census Bureau 2007 TIGER/Line Shapefiles
 United States National Atlas

External links
 City-Data.com
 Illinois State Archives

Townships in Effingham County, Illinois
Townships in Illinois